Frank Bradford (October 21, 1941 – February 2, 2022) was an American lawyer and politician.

Bradford was born in Sumter, South Carolina, and graduated from Sumter High School. He received his bachelor's degree in business administration management from University of South Carolina in 1965 and his law degree from University of South Carolina School of Law in 1968. He was admitted to the South Carolina and Georgia bars. Bradford practiced law in and lived in Smyrna, Georgia. He served in the Georgia House of Representatives from 1997 to 1999 and was a Republican. He died on February 2, 2022, at the age of 80, in Smyrna, Georgia.

References

1941 births
2022 deaths
People from Sumter, South Carolina
People from Smyrna, Georgia
University of South Carolina alumni
University of South Carolina School of Law alumni
Georgia (U.S. state) lawyers
South Carolina lawyers
Republican Party members of the Georgia House of Representatives